is a former professional baseball pitcher and manager in Japan's Nippon Professional Baseball. He was elected to the Japanese Baseball Hall of Fame in 1999.

References

External links

1925 births
2006 deaths
Baseball people from Aichi Prefecture
Japanese baseball players
Nippon Professional Baseball pitchers
Nishitetsu Baseball Club players
Yomiuri Giants players
Chunichi Dragons players
Managers of baseball teams in Japan
Chunichi Dragons managers
Yokohama DeNA BayStars managers
Hokkaido Nippon-Ham Fighters managers
Japanese Baseball Hall of Fame inductees